Okhla railway station is a railway station in Okhla which is a residential and commercial neighborhood of East Delhi area of Delhi. Its code is OKA. The station is part of the Delhi Suburban Railway. The station consists of seven platforms. The platforms are not well sheltered. It lacks many facilities including water and sanitation. Station is located just behind the Okhla subzi mandi and play a vital role of transportation for vendors who trade vegetable and fruits.

Trains 

Some of the trains that runs from Okhla are:

 Agra Cantt. - New Delhi Intercity Express
 Agra Cantt. - Nizamuddin MEMU
 Agra Cantt. - Old Delhi Passenger
 Andaman Express
 Hazrat Nizamuddin - Kosi Kalan Passenger
 Hazrat Nizamuddin - Palwal MEMU
 Mandsor - Meerut City Link Express
 Bandra Terminus- Dehradun Express
 Firozpur Janta Express
 Udyan Abha Toofan Express

See also
 Hazrat Nizamuddin railway station
 New Delhi Railway Station
 Delhi Junction Railway station
 Anand Vihar Railway Terminal
 Sarai Rohilla Railway Station
 Delhi Metro

References 

Railway stations in East Delhi district
Delhi railway division